Hit and Run is a 1924 silent American comedy drama film directed by Edward Sedgwick and starring western star Hoot Gibson as a member of a baseball team. It was produced and distributed by Universal Pictures.

Plot
As described in a film magazine, they called him "Swat" Anderson (Gibson) where the cactus made life tough for outfielders and where the man who caught Swat's hits rode a bucking bronco. "Red" McCarthy (Donlin), a baseball scout for Joe Burn's (Jennings) club, got sore at Burns while riding on a transcontinental limited and jumped of at a watering hole with his daughter, Joan (Harlan). Nothing there but the water tank and God's scenery — until a bunch of cowboys gathered in the limitless desert and started to play baseball. Then "Red" McCarthy got the surprise of his big league life — he saw an untrained cowboy hit a ball so hard that it took a man on a horse to find it after a hard ride. McCarthy, true to type, signed the prodigy up on the spot, and Swat was off to another world. He was taken to Burns at the Southern training quarters. There he was laughed at and ridiculed for his inability to catch a ball, until he picked up a bat. The minute wood touched horse-hide he was the idol of the club. But George Collins (Ring), secretary of the club, saw no good in him, because the newcomer attracted Joan McCarthy, with whom Collins liked to think of himself as the best attraction. Consequently, he made life miserable for the green wonder, and when the big game was about to come off, with Swat as the mainstay of the club, Collins laid his plans carefully to put Swat out of commission, thus ruining Swat's chances with the girl and at the same time helping his own chances a little by some side betting on the game. But the best laid plans of mice and men gang aft astray, and the ninth inning of the great game finds a surprise for both sides and much of it has to do with the lady in the case.

Cast

Preservation status
A print of Hit and Run is preserved in the George Eastman House.

See also
 Hoot Gibson filmography

References

External links

 
 
 

1924 films
American silent feature films
Films directed by Edward Sedgwick
Universal Pictures films
American black-and-white films
1924 comedy-drama films
1920s English-language films
1920s American films
Silent American comedy-drama films